Delilah Dirk is a series of action adventure graphic novels following adventures of the titular character, Delilah Dirk. Written and illustrated by Tony Cliff, Delilah Dirk started as a webcomic, and now consists of three full graphic novels and one shorter story.

Creation 
Writer and illustrator Tony Cliff is a Canadian cartoonist and animator also known for his contributions to the Flight anthology series. He started working on Delilah Dirk as a 30-page comic inspired by the Napoleonic Wars, Indiana Jones, and James Bond. Cliff combined this initial comic with a short story from the Flight anthology with another hundred pages to create the first complete published story, Delilah Dirk and the Turkish Lieutenant.

Cliff has also cited Horatio Hornblower and the Sharpe series, as well as the histories of the Elgin Marbles and the Venus de Milo as inspirations. He describes himself as "enthusiastic for historical elements" but adds that "if I feel like some historical accuracy is putting a speed bump in an otherwise smooth story, I'd like to think I'd favor the story over the accuracy". He has also stated that part of the inspiration for the series was to contrast with the humorless depiction of women in late '90s superhero comics.

Works 
Delilah Dirk is an action adventure comic set in the 19th century. The main character is a trained sword fighter who fights pirates while travelling the world on her flying boat.

Delilah Dirk and the Treasure of Constantinople
The first publication of a Delilah Dirk adventure was a 28-page comic made in 2007. It would later become chapter 1 of Delilah Dirk and the Turkish Lieutenant.

Delilah Dirk and the Aqueduct 
The next publication of a Delilah Dirk adventure was in Flight Volume 5. Flight was an anthology series, and volume 5 was published in 2008. The pages and plot from this short story would later become chapter 3 of the longer work Delilah Dirk and the Turkish Lieutenant.

Delilah Dirk and the Turkish Lieutenant
The first book of the series is set in Turkey in 1807. Dirk escapes a Turkish prison while befriending a mild-mannered Jannissary officer named Selim who becomes her sidekick. Dirk then plots to steal treasure from the pirate Zakul.

Delilah Dirk and the Seeds of Good Fortune
This shorter story, written between The Turkish Lieutenant and The King's Shilling, is 36 pages and is in black and white rather than color like the full graphic novels. Dirk needs to obtain a signature from a corrupt chieftain of a small Greek town, but her plan unravels due to the greedy manipulations of a local merchant.

Delilah Dirk and the King's Shilling 
The second graphic novel was released in 2016. In it, Dirk and Selim are accused of espionage against the British crown, and must clear their names. This book was originally tentatively titled Delilah Dirk and the Blades of England.

Delilah Dirk and the Pillars of Hercules 
The third graphic novel was released in 2018. It is set in central Asia and relates to the location of the legendary third pillar of Hercules.

Publication history 
Delilah Dirk and the Turkish Lieutenant was first published online, starting on May 28, 2011. By December 2011 it was in its fourth chapter and it was fully published online by February 2012. Tony Cliff stated that had always intended The Turkish Lieutenant to become a printed graphic novel, and he serialized the book online to gauge public interest. Delilah Dirk first appeared in print in French, published by Éditions Akileos in 2011. An English print book, which added around a dozen pages to the web version and edited some of its text, was published by First Second Books in 2013. First Second Books has published the subsequent books as well.

The second book in the series, Delilah Dirk and the King's Shilling, was partially published online before the release of the book. The first 90 of the 160 pages were published online serially and for free before the book's release. Delilah Dirk and the Pillars of Hercules similarly had about 100 pages released online prior to the print publication of the entire story.

Reception 
The Turkish Lieutenant received many positive reviews. Reviewers for Comic Alliance wrote that "Delilah Dirk reminds me of the best aspects of classic Disney movies, but skews towards a much more mature audience without being "adult" in a way that could turn off some readers" and "sassy lady protagonists are my jam so it's unsurprising that I really enjoy Delilah Dirk. Tony Cliff is an excellent storyteller who keeps the action constantly moving. But most importantly for a book about a sassy lady, he pulls off excellent body language and facial expressions". Reviewing the Turkish Lieutenant, a CBR.com reviewer called it "a charming story, saying that "Cliff really makes the friendship between Dirk and Selim feel real... These are two fascinating characters who have good chemistry with each other, and the fact that Cliff's writing is so often funny as well as insightful makes this an even more delightful read". It also received positive comments from Boing Boing, io9, and Wired.

Delilah Dirk and the Turkish Lieutenant was a New York Times bestseller in 2013. It was named both A Publishers Weekly Best Children's Book of 2013 and Best Teen Book of 2013 by Kirkus Reviews. It was also nominated for an Eisner Award for Best Digital Comic in 2012 and has also received Shuster and Harvey nominations.

Adaptations 
In 2016, Walt Disney Pictures announced a live-action adaptation of Delilah Dirk and the Turkish Lieutenant. Roy Lee was named as one of the producers. As of late 2019 there was no further information on the status of the project.

External links 
 Official website

References 

2007 comics debuts
2011 webcomic debuts
Canadian webcomics
Canadian graphic novels
Adventure webcomics
Adventure graphic novels
Comics about women
First Second Books books